Nataliia Prologaieva (born 17 February 1981), also known as Nataliia Ziani (Наталія Зіяні), is a Ukrainian Paralympic swimmer who won gold at the 2012 Summer Paralympics in the women's 100 metre breaststroke SB4 and women's 200 metre individual medley SM5 events.

References

External links 
 

1981 births
Living people
Paralympic swimmers of Ukraine
Paralympic gold medalists for Ukraine
Swimmers at the 2012 Summer Paralympics
Medalists at the 2012 Summer Paralympics
S5-classified Paralympic swimmers
Paralympic medalists in swimming
Ukrainian female breaststroke swimmers
Ukrainian female medley swimmers
21st-century Ukrainian women